Mans Meijer (15 September 1916 – 1 December 2011) was a Dutch painter. His work was part of the painting event in the art competition at the 1948 Summer Olympics.

References

1916 births
2011 deaths
20th-century Dutch painters
Dutch male painters
Olympic competitors in art competitions
Painters from Amsterdam
20th-century Dutch male artists